The 1996 World Figure Skating Championships were held in Edmonton, Canada on March 17–24. Medals were awarded in the disciplines of men's singles, ladies' singles, pair skating, and ice dancing.

Medal tables

Medalists

Medals by country

Competition notes
The opening ceremonies were composed by Canadian composer Jan Randall and narrated by Kurt Browning.

Results

Men

Ladies

Pairs

Ice dancing

References

External links
 1996 worlds results
  
  
  
  

World Figure Skating Championships
World Figure Skating Championships
World Figure Skating Championships
World Figure Skating Championships
World Figure Skating Championships
1990s in Edmonton